Nuevo Palacio Aurinegro is an indoor arena in Puerto Madryn, Argentina. It is primarily used for basketball and is the home arena of the Deportivo Madryn. It holds 3,500 people.

Indoor arenas in Argentina
Basketball venues in Argentina